Natalie Burn (born Natalia Guslistaya) is a Ukrainian-American actress, model, screenwriter and film producer. She is known for appearing in the films The Expendables 3, Downhill, and Mechanic: Resurrection.

Early life and career
Burn was born Natalia Guslistaya in Kyiv, Ukraine.As a child, she attended the Bolshoi Ballet School in Moscow, and later the Royal Ballet School in London. She started her career as actress, model and then became a writer and producer, and owned a production company, 7Heaven Productions.

In 2014, Burn had a tiny role in the action adventure film The Expendables 3. She also was a producer of Devil's Hope and in 2015, she wrote, starred, and produced the action film Awaken.

In 2016, Burn appeared in the film Criminal, and played a supporting role in Mechanic: Resurrection, alongside Jason Statham.

Personal life
In April 2018, Burn became an American citizen.

Filmography

Film

TV

References

External links
 
 
 

Actors from Kyiv
American film actresses
American female dancers
American female models
21st-century American women singers
21st-century American singers
American film producers
American screenwriters
American women film producers
Film people from Kyiv
Living people
Ukrainian emigrants to the United States
Ukrainian film actresses
Ukrainian female dancers
Ukrainian female models
21st-century Ukrainian women singers
Ukrainian film producers
Ukrainian women film producers
Women screenwriters
Ukrainian screenwriters
Year of birth missing (living people)
21st-century women